The Sachsen Tour is a multi-stage road bicycle race held in the region of Saxony, Germany. It was first held in 1985 and since 2005 it has been organised as a 2.1 event on the UCI Europe Tour. Between 1985 and 1995 it was an amateur race.

It is usually held in 5 stages, running through all of Saxony. This includes flat stages as well as mountain stages in the Erzgebirge.

Winners

External links 
 Official Website 

UCI Europe Tour races
Cycle races in Germany
Recurring sporting events established in 1985
1985 establishments in Germany
Sport in Saxony